Fritillaria maximowiczii is a plant species known from northeastern China (Hebei, Heilongjiang, Jilin, Liaoning) and eastern Russia (Zabaykalsky Krai, Amur, Khabarovsk, Primorye).

Leaves are whorled, linear to lanceolate, up to 10 cm long. Flowers are nodding, reddish-purple with yellow markings.

References

External links
line drawing of Fritillaria maximowiczii, Flora of China Illustrations vol. 24, fig. 113, 2-3 

maximowiczii
Flora of Chita Oblast
Flora of Amur Oblast
Flora of Khabarovsk Krai
Flora of Primorsky Krai
Flora of Manchuria
Flora of North-Central China
Plants described in 1903